Acanthocnemes is a genus of moths in the family Lyonetiidae.

Species
Acanthocnemes fuscoscapulella Chambers, 1878

External links
Butterflies and Moths of the World Generic Names and their Type-species

Lyonetiidae
Moth genera